The ūkēkē is a musical bow made of koa wood, 16 to 24 inches long and about 1 inches wide with two or three strings fastened through and around either end, tuned to an A major triad.  Prior to the introduction of steel strings, gut or sennit (coconut fibre) was used.

The strings were strummed with one hand while the other hand kept the ʻūkēkē in position. The mouth would then act as a resonating chamber.  The old experts made no sound with the vocal cords, but the mouth acted as a resonance chamber. The resulting sound suggested speech and trained persons could understand. It was sometimes used for love making.

The ʻūkēkē is the only stringed instrument indigenous to Hawaii, with other Hawaiian string instruments like the ukulele and slack-key guitar having been introduced by European sailors and settlers.

Modern usage
The 19th-century Hawaiian kumu hula Ioane Ūkēkē played the ʻūkēkē. Hawaiian artists such as Palani Vaughan and Ranga Pae have incorporated the ūkēkē into their compositions.

Bibliography
 Roberts, Helen H. 1967. Ancient Hawaiian Music. New York: Dover Publications
 Mary Kawena Pukui 1986 Hawaiian Dictionary. University of Hawaii Press

External links 
 'Ukeke - A sound clip of the ʻūkēkē performed by Ranga Pae

Musical bows
Hawaiian musical instruments